Victor Adibe Chikwe (June 24, 1938 – September 16, 2010) was the Nigerian Roman Catholic prelate who was the first bishop of the Roman Catholic Diocese of Ahiara from his appointment on November 18, 1987, until his death on September 16, 2010. He was formally ordained bishop on January 6, 1988.

References

1938 births
2010 deaths
21st-century Roman Catholic bishops in Nigeria
People from Imo State
20th-century Roman Catholic bishops in Nigeria
Roman Catholic bishops of Ahiara